Mario Liebers (born 1 January 1960) is a German former competitive figure skater who represented East Germany. He is the 1977 Blue Swords champion, the 1978 Prize of Moscow News bronze medalist, and a five-time East German national silver medalist. He finished in the top ten at the 1978 World Championships and at three European Championships.

After retiring from competition, Liebers became a dentist based in Berlin. He and his wife Kerstin, a former sprinter, are the parents of German figure skaters Martin Liebers (born in 1985) and Peter Liebers (born in 1988).

Competitive highlights

References 

East German figure skaters
Living people
1960 births
Sportspeople from Dresden